The Ellé is a river in the region of Brittany, western France. Its source is south of the town Rostrenen, in the south-west of the department Côtes-d'Armor. The Ellé flows southwest through the following départements and towns:

 Côtes-d'Armor
 Morbihan: Le Faouët
 Finistère: Quimperlé

At the town of Quimperlé it is joined by the Isole to form the Laïta that flows into the Atlantic Ocean at Le Pouldu.

References

Rivers of France
Rivers of Brittany
Rivers of Côtes-d'Armor
Rivers of Morbihan
Rivers of Finistère